Mpinga-Kayove is a commune of Rutana Province in southeastern Burundi. The capital lies at Mpinga-Kayove.

References

Communes of Burundi
Rutana Province